The Piva (Serbian Cyrillic: Пива) is the river in Montenegro and Bosnia and Herzegovina. The river runs through Montenegro for the most of its course length, and in its last three kilometres represents the border between the two countries.

Course 
The Piva emerges from the Sinjac wellspring (Cyrillic: Сињац; etymologically sinjac is derivative of sinji/sinje/sinja, rooted in proto-slavic, and means having a blue tinge, bluish color, gray, gray-blue, so Sinjac could be translated in modern ), which is also simply called Wellspring of Piva (Cyrillic: Врело Пиве), situated near the Piva Monastery underneath of Golija mountain. After a kilometer or so, and before the artificial Lake Piva was formed, the waters from the well rushed into the river Komarnica (Cyrillic: Комарница) thus creating the Piva river for the next 34 km. However, Komarnica is part of an 86 km long river system (Tušina→Bukovica→Komarnica), so measured from the source of the Tušina river (Cyrillic: Тушина), the Piva, nicknamed 'the river with five names', is 120 km long.

The Tušina originates from the mountain Sinjajevina in the Uskoci region of central Montenegro, just few kilometers away from the source of another important Montenegrin river, Morača. The river flows to the west, between the Sinjajevina and Lola mountains, next to the villages of Krnja Jela, Bare, Boan and Tušina. It receives from the north the Bukovica river (Cyrillic: Буковица), and continues further under this name. After the river passes the regional center of Šavnik and the villages of Gradac and Pridvorica in the region of Drobnjaci, the stream receives from the north the Komarnica and takes its name.

The Komarnica continues between the mountains of Vojnik and Treskavac, in an almost uninhabited area (village of Duži) and enters the high Piva Pleateau, where it turns north (almost all of the Komarnica's course is flooded by the reservoir of the Lake Piva), receives from the right outflow of the Piva well and enters the deep Piva canyon.

The canyon is cut between the mountains of Bioč, Volujak, Maglić and Pivska planina, its 33 km long, deep up to 1.200 m and river generates immense power used for the power station of Mratinje (342 MW) which dammed the canyon in 1975. The dam is 220 m high, one of the highest in Europe and creates Lake Piva, second largest in Montenegro (12,5 km², altitude 675 m, 188 m deep), which flooded the old location of the monastery of Piva from the 16th century, so the monastery was moved to the new one. The Vrbnica river flows from the left into the lake.

After the dam, the Piva continues straight to the north, meets the Tara at Šćepan Polje on the border with Bosnia and Herzegovina and creates the Drina.

The Piva belongs to the Black Sea drainage basin with its own drainage area of 1,784 km² and is not navigable.

Piva Plateau 
Pivska površ (Cyrillic: Пивска површ), is a high limestone plateau in the drainage area of Piva, between the mountains of Durmitor, Maglić, Lebršnik, Golija and Vojnik. The plateau is 55 km long, 30 km wide with an average altitude of 1.200 m, the highest 2.159 m. The flow of Komarnica-Piva divides it in two regions: western one, Pivska Župa (Cyrillic: Пивска Жупа) and eastern one, Pivska planina (Cyrillic: Пивска планина). Area is characterized by many limestone features, like cavities (called vrtača, вртача) deep pits and excavations, and extremely sparsely populated (some 20 smaller settlements in Pivska Župa and 15 in Pivska planina).
Stock breeding is developed though, especially sheep.

See also 
 Tara (Drina)
 Drina

References 
 Mala Prosvetina Enciklopedija, Third edition (1985); Prosveta; 
 Jovan Đ. Marković (1990): Enciklopedijski geografski leksikon Jugoslavije; Svjetlost-Sarajevo; 

Rivers of Montenegro
Rivers of Bosnia and Herzegovina
International rivers of Europe